Princess Elizabeth may refer to:

British
 Elizabeth of York, daughter of Edward IV of England,  wife of Henry VII of England and mother of Henry VIII of England
 Elizabeth Tudor (1492–1495), daughter of King Henry VII
 Elizabeth I of England (1533–1603), who was known as Princess Elizabeth before her accession
 Elizabeth Stuart, Queen of Bohemia, daughter of James VI & I, King of England, Scotland and Ireland, and Electress Palatine and Queen of Bohemia
 Elizabeth of England and Scotland, daughter of Charles I of England and Scotland
 Princess Elizabeth of Great Britain (1741–1759), granddaughter of George II of Great Britain and daughter of Frederick, Prince of Wales
 Princess Elizabeth of the United Kingdom (1770–1840), daughter of King George III
 Princess Elizabeth of Clarence (1820–1821), daughter of William IV of the United Kingdom
 Elizabeth Bowes-Lyon, Duchess of York, following her marriage to the future George VI, later Queen Elizabeth the Queen Mother
 Elizabeth II (1926–2022), known as HRH Princess Elizabeth of York and HRH The Princess Elizabeth before accession to the thrones of the United Kingdom, Canada, Australia, New Zealand, South Africa, Ceylon, and Pakistan in 1952

German
 Princess Elisabeth of Hesse and by Rhine (1864–1918), wife of Grand Duke Sergei Alexandrovich of Russia
 Princess Elisabeth of Hesse and by Rhine (1895–1903), niece of Tsar Nicholas II
 Princess Elisabeth of Anhalt (1857–1933), Grand Duchess of Mecklenburg-Strelitz, of the German Empire
 Elisabeth of Stolberg-Rossla, wife of Duke Johann Albrecht of Mecklenburg of the German Empire
 Elisabeth of Bohemia, philosopher
 Elisabeth Christine of Brunswick-Wolfenbüttel (1691–1750), wife of future Charles VI, Holy Roman Emperor
 Princess Elisabeth Anna of Prussia (1857–1895), granddaughter of Leopold IV, Duke of Anhalt, of the German Empire
 Princess Elisabeth of Saxe-Altenburg (disambiguation), multiple people
 Princess Elisabeth Sophie of Saxe-Altenburg (1619–1680), daughter of John Philip, Duke of Saxe-Altenburg
 Princess Elisabeth of Saxony (1830–1912), wife of Prince Ferdinand, Duke of Genoa
 Princess Elisabeth of Thurn and Taxis (1860–1881), daughter of Maximilian Anton Lamoral, Hereditary Prince of Thurn and Taxis
 Princess Elisabeth von Thurn und Taxis (born 1982), daughter of Johannes, 11th Prince of Thurn und Taxis
 Princess Elisabeth Helene of Thurn and Taxis (1903–1976), and a Princess and Duchess of Saxony, Margravine consort of Meissen, and titular Queen consort of Saxony through her marriage to Friedrich Christian, Margrave of Meissen
 Princess Elisabeth Albertine of Saxe-Hildburghausen (1713–1761), daughter of Ernest Frederick I, Duke of Saxe-Hildburghausen, of the German Empire

Other
 Elisabeth of Hungary, daughter of Andrew II of Hungary, and Saint
 Elisabeth of Romania (1894–1956), wife of future George II of Greece
 Elizabeth Ka'akaualaninui Wilcox, great-granddaughter of Gideon Peleioholani Laanui, Hawaiian chief
 Elizabeth Kekaaniau, daughter of Gideon Peleioholani Laanui, Hawaiian chief
 Princess Elisabeth, Duchess of Brabant (born 2001), daughter and Heiress Apparent of King Philippe of the Belgians
 Princess Elisabeth of Denmark (1935–2018), granddaughter of King Christian X
 Princess Élisabeth of France (1764–1794), sister of Louis XVI
 Princess Elisabeth, Duchess of Hohenberg (1922–2011), of Luxembourg, granddaughter of Robert I, Duke of Parma
 Princess Élisabeth Charlotte of Lorraine (1700–1711), daughter of Duke of Lorraine
 Princess Elisabeth of Savoy-Carignan, granddaughter of Vittorio Emanuele II
 Princess Elizabeth of Greece and Denmark (1904–1955), middle daughter of Prince Nicholas of Greece and Elena Vladimirovna; wife of Karl Feodor of Torreing-Jettenbach
 Princess Elizabeth of Sweden (1549–1597), daughter of Gustav I of Sweden
 Princess Elizabeth of Toro (born 1936), Batebe of Toro, Ugandan politician, diplomat, lawyer, model, and actress, former Minister for Foreign Affairs and aunt of current king
 Princess Elizabeth of Yugoslavia (born 1936), member of the Serbian-Yugoslavian Karageorgevich dynasty, human rights activist and former candidate for President of Serbia

Non-human
 LMS Princess Royal Class 6201 Princess Elizabeth, preserved railway engine
 Princess Elizabeth Alps, a mountain range in Greenland
 Princess Elizabeth Avenue, Edmonton, Canada
 Princess Elisabeth Base, a Belgian research station on Antarctica
 Princess Elizabeth Challenge Cup, a rowing event
 Princess Elizabeth Land, a sector of Antarctica
 Princess Elizabeth Primary School, a primary school in Bukit Batok New Town, Singapore
 Princess Elizabeth Stakes, a horse race in Epsom, England
 Princess Elizabeth Stakes (Canada), a horse race in Toronto, Ontario
 , a paddlesteamer launched in 1926 that was one of the Little Ships of Dunkirk

See also
Queen Elizabeth (disambiguation)